The Pursuit of Love is a British romance drama television miniseries written and directed by Emily Mortimer. It is based on the 1945 novel The Pursuit of Love by Nancy Mitford, which had previously been adapted as Love in a Cold Climate (1980 TV series) and Love in a Cold Climate (2001 TV series). It premiered on 9 May 2021.

Premise
Two cousins navigate their lives and friendship, as they seek different things in life.

Cast
Emily Beecham as Fanny Logan (the narrator)
Lily James as The Honourable Linda Radlett (Fanny's cousin)
Dominic West as Matthew Radlett, Lord Alconleigh (Linda's father)
Dolly Wells as Sadie Radlett, Lady Alconleigh (Linda's mother)
Beattie Edmondson as The Honourable Louisa Radlett (Linda's older sister)
Annabel Mullion as Aunt Emily (Fanny's de facto mother)
Emily Mortimer as The Bolter (Fanny's real mother; Emily & Sadie's younger sister)
John Heffernan as Davey (Aunt Emily's fiancée)
Andrew Scott as Lord Merlin
Freddie Fox as Tony Kroesig
Shazad Latif as Alfred Wyncham/Wincham
James Frecheville as Christian Talbot
Assaad Bouab as Fabrice de Sauveterre
Georgina Morgan as Young Fanny
Swift & Scarlet as Lord Merlin's whippets

Episodes

Production
It was announced in December 2019 that the BBC had commissioned the series, an adaptation of the 1945 Nancy Mitford novel. Emily Mortimer was announced as writer and director of the series, with Lily James starring.

Filming on the series had initially begun in the spring of 2020, but had to be postponed due to the COVID-19 pandemic. It would resume in July in Bristol and Bath, Somerset, with the cast additions of Andrew Scott, Emily Beecham, Dominic West, Dolly Wells, Beattie Edmondson, Assaad Bouab, Shazad Latif and Freddie Fox, and Amazon Studios joining the project as a co-producer.

Reception
The series received positive reviews from critics in the UK press. In the Radio Times, Eleanor Bley Griffiths wrote "[...]I do know that each episode was a joy and a pleasure to watch – and when it comes to Sunday night TV, you can’t ask for more than that." 

For The Telegraph Anita Singh praised the show overall but criticised the casting of James: "It is enjoyable, and the first episode is quite the best. But its leading lady is all wrong, despite looking the part" while Ed Cumming in The Independent was more complimentary about her: "Free to pout and strut and grumble like a teenager, James relaxes more into her role than she did on her last outing, as a lovestruck archaeologist in The Dig." 

Lucy Mangan in The Guardian gave the first episode the maximum five stars, stating "The insistent intertwining of the pain with the laughter, instead of flattening the tale into a Wodehouse-with-women yarn, makes this adaptation feel like a classic in its own right. It is a treat for all. Mitfordians – please, do give it a chance." The Financial Times also gave a generally positive review to the show.

Soundtrack
The series' soundtrack contains many British and US acts and French singers. The first episode prominently includes T. Rex's song "Dandy in the Underworld" in the ballroom sequence which introduces the character of Lord Merlin, played by Andrew Scott.

Bryan Ferry – "The In Crowd"
Le Tigre – "Deceptacon"
 New Order – "Ceremony"
T. Rex – "Dandy in the Underworld"
Cat Power – "Sea of Love"
Sleater-Kinney – "Modern Girl"
Marianne Faithfull – "Give My Love to London"
Joan Armatrading – "Woncha Come On Home"
Karen Dalton – "Are you Leaving for the Country"
The Meters – "Cissy Strut"
Nina Simone – "Be My Husband"
John Cale – "Paris 1919"
Maria Arnal  – "A La Vida"
Blossom Dearie – "Plus Je t'embrasse"
Juliette Greco – "Déshabillez-moi"
Yves Montand – "Rue St Vincent"
Marino Marini – "Guaglione"
The Who – "Blue, Red and Grey"

References

External links
 
 
 

2021 British television series debuts
2021 British television series endings
2020s British drama television series
2020s British romance television series
BBC television dramas
2020s British television miniseries
Television shows based on British novels
English-language television shows
Television series by Amazon Studios